Psyllipsocus is a genus of cave barklice in the family Psyllipsocidae. There are more than 50 described species in Psyllipsocus.

Species
These 55 species belong to the genus Psyllipsocus:

 Psyllipsocus albipalpus Mockford, 2011
 Psyllipsocus angustipennis Lienhard, 2014
 Psyllipsocus apache Mockford, 2011
 Psyllipsocus batuensis Thornton, 1962
 Psyllipsocus bombayensis Menon, 1942
 Psyllipsocus chamela Garcia Aldrete, 1984
 Psyllipsocus chiquibulensis Garcia Aldrete, 1997
 Psyllipsocus clunioventralis Lienhard, 2014
 Psyllipsocus clunjunctus Lienhard, 2013
 Psyllipsocus decoratus Mockford, 2011
 Psyllipsocus delamarei Badonnel, 1962
 Psyllipsocus didymus Lienhard, 2014
 Psyllipsocus disparunguis Lienhard, 2009
 Psyllipsocus dorae Badonnel, 1973
 Psyllipsocus edentulus Menon, 1942
 Psyllipsocus falcifer Lienhard, 2014
 Psyllipsocus flexuosus Mockford, 2011
 Psyllipsocus fuscipalpus Mockford, 2011
 Psyllipsocus fuscistigma Lienhard, 2014
 Psyllipsocus garciamolinai Garcia Aldrete, 1984
 Psyllipsocus hilli Mockford, 2011
 Psyllipsocus hirsutus Thornton, 1962
 Psyllipsocus huastecanus Mockford, 2011
 Psyllipsocus hyalinus Garcia Aldrete, 1993
 Psyllipsocus kintpuashi Mockford, 2011
 Psyllipsocus maculatus Li, 2002
 Psyllipsocus marconii Lienhard, 2014
 Psyllipsocus metamicropterus (Enderlein, 1908)
 Psyllipsocus minutissimus (Enderlein, 1920)
 Psyllipsocus monticolus Garcia Aldrete, 1989
 Psyllipsocus neoleonensis Garcia Aldrete, 1993
 Psyllipsocus oculatus Gurney, 1943
 Psyllipsocus orghidani Badonnel, 1977
 Psyllipsocus ornatus Badonnel, 1973
 Psyllipsocus poblanus Mockford, 2011
 Psyllipsocus proximus Lienhard, 2014
 Psyllipsocus punctulatus Lienhard, 2014
 Psyllipsocus radiopictus Lienhard, 2014
 Psyllipsocus ramburii Selys-Longchamps, 1872
 Psyllipsocus regiomontanus Mockford, 2011
 Psyllipsocus sanxiaensis Li, 1997
 Psyllipsocus sauteri (Enderlein, 1906)
 Psyllipsocus serrifer Lienhard, 2013
 Psyllipsocus similis Lienhard, 2013
 Psyllipsocus sinicus Li & Yang, 1988
 Psyllipsocus spinifer Lienhard, 2014
 Psyllipsocus spinosus Badonnel, 1955
 Psyllipsocus squamatus Mockford, 2011
 Psyllipsocus stupendus Lienhard & Garcia Aldrete, 2016
 Psyllipsocus subterraneus Mockford, 2011
 Psyllipsocus subtilis Lienhard, 2014
 Psyllipsocus thaidis Lienhard, 2014
 Psyllipsocus yongi New & Lee, 1992
 Psyllipsocus yucatan Gurney, 1943
 † Psyllipsocus eocenicus Nel, Prokop, De Ploeg & Millet, 2005 Oise amber, France, Eocene
 † Psyllipsocus yoshizawai Álvarez-Parra et al. 2020 Burmese amber, Myanmar, Cenomanian

References

Trogiomorpha
Articles created by Qbugbot